Grim may refer to:

People
 Grim (surname)
 Myron Grim Natwick (1890–1990), American artist, animator and film director best known for drawing Betty Boop

Mythical or fictional characters
 Grim, Old Norse Grímr, from the Norse saga Gríms saga loðinkinna
 The name of two brothers and two drinking horns in the short Icelandic saga Helga þáttr Þórissonar
 Church grim, a spectral black dog
 Fossegrim, a Norwegian water spirit also called "the grim"
 The title character of Grim the Collier of Croydon, a play of uncertain authorship first published in 1662
 Grim (Billy & Mandy), from the animated television series The Grim Adventures of Billy & Mandy
 The Grim, an omen of death in the form of a black dog in the novel, film and game Harry Potter and the Prisoner of Azkaban
 A character from the Japanese visual novel Chaos;Head

Places
 Grim, Vest-Agder, a borough in Kristiansand, Norway
 Grim Rock, off the coast of Graham Land, Antarctica
 Grim Township, Michigan
 Grim's Ditch or Dyke, many places in Great Britain referring to prehistoric or Roman earthworks attributed to Woden
 Cape Grim, a cape in Tasmania, Australia
 The Grim, a colloquial name for the North-West Frontier region in north-west Pakistan and south-eastern Afghanistan; see Military history of the North-West Frontier

Music
 GRIM (Groupe de recherche et d'improvisation musicales), Marseille, France, a non-profit institute for improvised and experimental music
 Grim (band), a Montenegrin rock group
 Grim (musical), a 2014 British stage musical
 Grim (album), by Ass Ponys (1992)

See also
 List of people known as the Grim
 GRIM test, a simple statistical test used to identify inconsistencies in the analysis of granular data sets
 Grim trigger, a strategy in game theory
 Grimm (disambiguation)
 Grim Reaper, a personification of death
 Grímr, a name of the Norse god Odin (see List of names of Odin)